"The Killer" is the fifth episode of The Vampire Diaries's fourth season, premiering November 8, 2012 on The CW.

Plot
Professor Shane plots with Connor to free Mystic Falls of vampires on the condition Bonnie is kept out of any danger. He tells Connor the truth about his tattoo, leading Connor to kidnap Jeremy. Taking him to the grill, he decides to entice every vampire in town to come for him, in the hope that he can kill as many as possible in order to complete the tattoo.

Elena, still struggling to adapt to being a vampire, decides to do whatever it takes to adapt in order to be there to protect Jeremy. When Connor takes Jeremy, Matt, and April hostage at the Grill, Stefan and Damon have a serious disagreement about the best course of action, and Elena is again caught between the two brothers. The situation quickly turns violent when Klaus sends one of his hybrids, Dean, to stand up to Connor. Things come to an end when Elena decides to take matters into her own hands to rescue her brother, leading to a dramatic and violent confrontation with Connor. She warns him to stay away from her brother. Then, when he neglects her request. She kills him.

Meanwhile, Caroline is surprised to come across Hayley in the Lockwood mansion. Despite Tyler's protestations that everything is completely innocent, Caroline is less than convinced, especially since she never knew about Hayley's existence.

Bonnie, still unable to perform magic, goes to see Professor Shane in the hope he can help her. Using hypnosis, he helps her to channel her magic and rediscover her powers.

Reception

Ratings 
When the episode aired on November 8, 2012, the episode was viewed by 3.02 million American viewers.

References

External links 
 Recap from Official Website

2012 American television episodes
The Vampire Diaries (season 4) episodes